Mark Kingston (born May 16, 1970) is an American college baseball coach. He is currently the head coach at the University of South Carolina.  He was previously the head coach at the University of South Florida and Illinois State University.

Playing career
Kingston played high school baseball at Potomac High School in Dumfries, Virginia where he was a Collegiate Baseball Top 50 recruit, and was drafted out of high school by the New York Yankees in the 35th round of the 1988 MLB Draft.  Choosing instead to play college ball at North Carolina, he played four seasons, helping the team to an Atlantic Coast Conference regular season title and berth in the 1989 College World Series in his freshman year.  He was drafted in the 45th round of the 1992 MLB Draft by the Milwaukee Brewers.  After playing rookie ball in the Brewers organization, he played four additional seasons in the Chicago Cubs organization, reaching Class-AA, and one season with the independent league Grays Harbor Gulls.

Coaching career
After his playing days were over, Kingston earned a position as an assistant coach at Purdue.  He earned the top assistant position after two seasons, and then served one year at Illinois State.  He then served two seasons at Miami (FL), where he helped guide the team to the 2001 College World Series title, produced two All-Americans, and saw 18 players sign professional contracts.  He then moved to Tulane as recruiting coordinator, where six of his seven classes were ranked in the Top 25 nationally by Collegiate Baseball.  The Green Wave reached the 2005 College World Series as the top seed, and earned academic honors in Omaha.  In 2009, Kingston served as associate head coach at Illinois State before being elevated to the top job the following season.

Kingston was named the head coach at South Florida ahead of the 2015 season. Kingston coached at USF from 2015 to 2017 and led the Bulls to a pair of NCAA Regional appearances.

On June 30, 2017, Kingston was named the head baseball coach at South Carolina, becoming the 30th head coach in program history. Despite inheriting a team that failed to reach the postseason the year before, Kingston led the Gamecocks to an NCAA Regional crown and an NCAA Super Regional appearance in his first year at the helm.

Head coaching record

See also
List of current NCAA Division I baseball coaches

References

External links

Living people
1970 births
Daytona Cubs players
Geneva Cubs players
Grays Harbor Gulls players
Helena Brewers players
Illinois State Redbirds baseball coaches
North Carolina Tar Heels baseball players
Orlando Cubs players
Peoria Chiefs players
Purdue Boilermakers baseball coaches
South Florida Bulls baseball coaches
Tulane Green Wave baseball coaches
Baseball players from Buffalo, New York
Baseball coaches from New York (state)